Auxiliary Interstate Highways (also called three-digit Interstate Highways) are a supplemental subset of the freeways within the Interstate Highway System of the United States. 
Auxiliary routes are generally classified as spur routes, which connect to the parent route at one end, bypasses, which connect to the parent route at both ends, or beltways, which form a complete circle intersecting the parent route at two locations. There are 323 auxiliary Interstates in the United States. There are some routes which connect to the parent route at one end, but connect to another route at the other end; some states treat these as spurs while others treat them as bypasses. Similar to the mainline Interstate Highways, these highways also meet all Interstate Highway standards (with rare exceptions), and they receive the same percentage of federal funding (90%).

The shorter auxiliary routes branch off main routes and are numbered based on the number of the parent route. All of the supplement routes for Interstate 95 (I-95) are designated with a three-digit number ending in "95" in the form I-x95. While some exceptions do exist, generally spur routes are numbered with an odd hundreds digit (such as I-395), while bypasses and beltways are numbered with an even hundreds digit (such as I-695).  Because longer Interstates may have many such supplemental routes, the numbers can repeat from state to state along their route, but they will not repeat within a state.

There are only three states that do not have any auxiliary Interstate Highways: Alaska, Arizona, and New Mexico. North Dakota has an auxiliary route, but it is unsigned, and Wyoming's does not meet Interstate Highway standards.

Terminology and guidelines

The basic tenets of the auxiliary Interstates are divided into three branches: spur, loop, and bypass routes. Each one signifies a different characteristic of the auxiliary route.

The first digit of the three digits usually determines whether a route is a bypass, spur, or beltway. The last two digits are derived from the main Interstate Highway. For instance, I-515 contains an odd number in the first digit (5), and this indicates that this freeway is a spur. The last two digits signify the highway's origin. In this case, the "15" in I-515 shows that it is a supplement to I-15.

Numerous exceptions to the standard numbering guidelines exist in many places.  This can be for a number of reasons.  In some cases, original routes were changed, extended, or abandoned, leaving discrepancies in the system.  In other cases, it may not be possible to use the proper number because the limited set of available numbers has been exhausted, causing a "non-standard" number to be used.

Spur route
A spur route's number usually has an odd number for its first digit. It is usually one of the following:
 It may serve another section of a city or metropolitan area not served by the main freeway (most often the central business district), terminating at a regular city street/avenue or at a substandard freeway, such as I-185 in Columbus, Georgia.
 It may represent the first portion of a contemplated extended freeway, one that downgrades to below Interstate standards with plans to upgrade it later on. An example is I-540 in Arkansas.
 It may connect two unrelated Interstate highways—as I-390 in New York State and I-355 in Illinois do.
 Note that states differ on their interpretation of the numbering convention in this case. In the I-390 example above, the route has both ends at Interstates, but not at the same Interstate on both ends, and is assigned an odd first digit. Another example is I-275 in Tennessee: it is a connector between I-40 and I-75 (a similar case of having both ends at Interstates but not at the same Interstate) and is assigned an even first digit.

Examples include:
 I-110 in California links I-10 with the Port of Los Angeles. This freeway was built before Interstate Highways as the Harbor Freeway. Later, it was adopted into the Interstate Highway System.
 I-180 in North-Central Pennsylvania connects Williamsport and Lycoming County with I-80 in Milton, which does not actually enter Lycoming County. I-180 also serves as a connection to those traveling to New York and I-86 via U.S. Route 15 and the Future I-99 Corridor at its western terminus.
 I-190 in New York connects the cities of Niagara Falls and Buffalo with I-90.

Sometimes, a three-digit Interstate Highway branches off from another three-digit Interstate Highway. These spurs do not connect directly with their parent highways, but are associated with them via the three-digit highways they do intersect with.

Examples include:
 I-380 in Northern California is located at the San Francisco Bay Area. This highway begins at I-280, and it connects with US 101 and San Francisco International Airport.
 I-190 in Massachusetts branches off from I-290 near Worcester.
 I-795 in Baltimore County, Maryland branches off from I-695.

Bypass
A bypass route may traverse around a city, or may run through it with the mainline bypassing. In a typical 3-digit Interstate Highway, bypasses usually have both its two termini junctioned with another Interstate highway. Bypass routes are preceded by an even number in the first digit.

Examples include:
 I-220 in Louisiana serves as a bypass of downtown Shreveport.
 I-440 forms a loop around the south side of Nashville.
 I-890 travels through downtown Schenectady, which I-90 avoids.

In the case of an auxiliary Interstate highway which has both ends at Interstates but not the same Interstate, some states treat these as bypasses while others treat these as spurs — see Spur route above.

Beltway
A beltway (also known as a loop route) completely surrounds a metropolitan city, and it is often connected with multiple junctions to other routes. Unlike other auxiliary Interstate Highways (and by extension, all primary Interstate Highways), beltways do not have termini; however, they have a place where the highway mileage resets to zero. Beltways are also preceded by an even number in the first digit.

Some examples of beltways include:
 I-275 in Ohio, Kentucky and Indiana encircles the city of Cincinnati.
 I-465 in Indiana encircles the city of Indianapolis.
 I-495 in Maryland and Virginia encircles the city of Washington, D.C. and is referred to as "The Capital Beltway".

Auxiliary Interstates

Note: this table sorts the route numbers by parent highway.

See also

Notes

References

External links
 
 3-digit Interstates at Kurumi.com

Z
Interstate Aux

es:Anexo:Autopistas Interestatales Primarias